Celiptera carbonensis is a moth of the family Erebidae. It is found in Peru.

References

Moths described in 2003
Celiptera